The Brighton Soccer Club is an Australian Community run soccer club based in the Melbourne suburb of Brighton. The club was founded in late 1987 by the merger of the original Brighton and Prahran City soccer clubs founded in 1924 and 1908 respectively. The club fields both senior and reserve teams for men & women, . This club has no connection to the defunct 'Prahran City Football Club' that competed in 2012–2015.

Honours

Historical (1909–1987)

Brighton (1925–1987)

Dockerty Cup
Winners (5): 1933, 1937, 1943, 1944, 1952
Runner's up (3): 1951, 1953, 1956
Victorian First Tier
Premiers (1): 1949
Runner's up (3): 1944, 1945, 1952

Victorian Second Tier
Premiers (1): 1927
Runner's up (2): 1930, 1961
Victorian Fourth Tier
Premiers (1): 1974
Runner's up (1): 1925, 1969

Prahran/Prahran City (1909–1987)

Dockerty Cup
Winners (2): 1942, 1946
Runners-up (4): 1910, 1937, 1939, 1941
Victorian First Tier
Premiers (4): 1927, 1939, 1944, 1945
Runner's up (5): 1937, 1941, 1943, 1946, 1947
Victorian Second Tier
Runner's up (3): 1926, 1936, 1955

Victorian Third Tier
Premiers (1): 1969
Victorian Fourth Tier
Premiers (1): 1985
Runner's up (1): 1968

Recent (1988–present)

Victorian Third Tier
Runner's up (1): 1990

Victorian Sixth Tier
Premiers (1): 2015 (South)

References

Soccer clubs in Melbourne
Association football clubs established in 1908
1908 establishments in Australia
Association football clubs established in 1924
1924 establishments in Australia
Association football clubs established in 1987
1987 establishments in Australia
Victorian State League teams
Victorian Premier League teams
Sport in the City of Bayside